The Lion and the Lamb is a 1930 mystery thriller novel by the British writer E. Phillips Oppenheim.

Synopsis
A young man from a notable family joins a gang of criminals in London, who leave him to take the rap for one of their jobs gone wrong. When he comes out of prison he is now Lord Newberry, with money and a large estate, due to the death of his father. He sets out to have his revenge against the gang who set him up.

Film adaptation
In 1931 it was made into  the film The Lion and the Lamb directed by George B. Seitz and starring Walter Byron, Carmel Myers and Montagu Love. It was produced by the Hollywood studio Columbia Pictures.

References

Bibliography
 Goble, Alan. The Complete Index to Literary Sources in Film. Walter de Gruyter, 1999.
 Reilly, John M. Twentieth Century Crime & Mystery Writers. Springer, 2015.

1930 British novels
Novels by E. Phillips Oppenheim
British thriller novels
British mystery novels
Novels set in London
Hodder & Stoughton books
British novels adapted into films